Ayalakab (Dargwa: ГӀяялахъяб) is a rural locality (a selo) and the administrative centre of Ayalakabsky Selsoviet, Levashinsky District, Republic of Dagestan, Russia. The population was 391 as of 2010. There are 8 streets.

Geography 
Ayalakab is located 19 km east of Levashi (the district's administrative centre) by road, on the Kakaozen River. Ayalakab and Purrimakhi are the nearest rural localities.

Nationalities 
Dargins live there.

References 

Rural localities in Levashinsky District